Geo Christ Danny Ekra (born 10 January 1999) is an Ivorian football player for Kaisar.

Club career
He made his debut in the Russian Football National League for FC Akron Tolyatti on 25 September 2021 in a game against FC Torpedo Moscow.

References

External links
 
 Profile by Russian Football National League
 

1999 births
Footballers from Abidjan
Living people
Ivorian footballers
Association football midfielders
FC Saxan players
FC Noah players
FC Tambov players
FC Olimpik Donetsk players
FC Akron Tolyatti players
Armenian Premier League players
Ukrainian Premier League players
Russian First League players
Ivorian expatriate footballers
Expatriate footballers in Moldova
Ivorian expatriate sportspeople in Moldova
Expatriate footballers in Armenia
Ivorian expatriate sportspeople in Armenia
Expatriate footballers in Russia
Ivorian expatriate sportspeople in Russia
Expatriate footballers in Ukraine
Ivorian expatriate sportspeople in Ukraine